Jamshed Town lies in the central part of Karachi, Pakistan. To the northwest is Liaquatabad Town across the Lyari River, while to the east is Gulshan Town and to the southeast is Korangi Town across the Malir River. Jamshed is bordered by Karachi Cantonment and Clifton Cantonment to the west. The population of Jamshed Town was estimated to be about 730,000 at the 1998 census, of which 99% are Muslim. Urdu speaking constitute an overwhelming majority of the population.

History 
Jamshed Town was named after Jamshed Nusserwanjee Mehta.  In 1922, he was elected president of the Karachi Municipality, an office which he occupied till October, 1932. He was born in 1886 in Karachi and died on 8 August 1952.

The federal government introduced local government reforms in the year 2000, which eliminated the previous third tier of government (administrative divisions) and raised the fourth tier (districts) to become the new third tier. The effect in Karachi was the dissolution of the former Karachi Division and the merger of its five districts to form a new Karachi City-District with eighteen autonomous constituent towns including Jamshed Town.

Economy 
Bhoja Air has its head office in PECHS, Jamshed Town.
Jamshed Town is the most populated town in Karachi. Karachi's most popular market Tariq Road, is located in PECHS, Jamshed Town.

Neighbourhoods of Jamshed Town 
Kashmir Colony

See also 

 Karachi Local Government
 Panchmukhi Hanuman Temple

References

External links 
 Karachi Website
 Jamshed Town

 
Karachi East District
Towns in Karachi